Jaafar Sheikh Mustafa (Kurdish: جەعفەر شێخ مستەفا born 1st July 1950 in Qaradagh, Suliymaniyah Governorate, Iraq) is the current Vice President of Kurdistan Region under Nechirvan Idris Barzani's administration. He is from Patriotic Union of Kurdistan.

He joined the Peshmarga partisans in 1969 and became head of administration of Aylul revolts (Kurdish: شۆڕشی ئەیلوول‎) in 1975, which is the First Iraqi–Kurdish War. In 1979 he joined The New Revolution movement and returned to the battlefield as commander of (Qaradagh 55 Division). In 1981 he became commander of (Bazian 2 Division). In 1982 he served as colonel/brigadier general of (Piramagrun 47 Regiment). Three years later, in 1985, he became Lieutenant General of (Erbil 4 Region) until the Anfal genocide (1986-1988). During the great Kurdish uprising in 1991 he was a commander of unit/district (1) of Darbandikhan, Khanaqin and Khrmatu as head of the uprising plan. In 1992 he became deputy general commander of (Jabar Farman), and alter that year became Erbil general commander. During the first Kurdish Parliament election in 1992 he was elected as an MP and then became vice minister of Peshmarga forces. Jaafar Sheikh Mustafa was one of the most active generals during the war against Islamist terrorists such as Ansar al-Islam and Daesh ISIL (2014-2017). From 2001 to 2003 on request of Jala Talabani, he returned as the Head of Peshmarga forces across Kurdistan Region. He also served as the Minister of Peshmerga Affairs in the Kurdistan Regional Government's seventh cabinet, from 2012 to 2016. Sheikh Jaafar remains one of the most active military commanders.

From 2014 he commanded the Peshmarga (70 forces), fighting against the Daesh ISIL until his election as Vice President of Kurdistan Region in 2019. He was appointed as Vice President by President Nechirvan Barzani on September 8, 2019.

References

External links
 Jaafar Sheikh Mustafa's profile on the official Kurdistan Regional Government website

Iraqi Kurdish people
1950 births
Kurdish politicians
Vice Presidents of Kurdistan Region
Patriotic Union of Kurdistan politicians
People from Sulaymaniyah Province
Living people
Kurdish military personnel